Me One (born Eric Martin on 19 August 1970), also known as MC Eric, is a Welsh musician, rapper, singer, songwriter and record producer, who rose to prominence for his work for the Belgian-based recording act Technotronic.

Early life
Born in Cardiff, Wales, Martin is the son of Jamaican parents; his mother an English teacher from Kingston and his father a Pentecostal Church minister from Saint Mary Parish. Martin was educated in Cardiff, London and New York City. He holds dual Jamaican and British citizenship.

Work with Technotronic
Martin (as MC Eric) was a member of techno/Eurodance act Technotronic, providing lead vocals on the 1990 hit single "This Beat Is Technotronic".  At the height of their career, they toured with Madonna on her Blond Ambition World Tour in the 1990s.

2000s–present
Martin's debut album under the name Me One was released in May 2000 on Universal-Island UK. The 12-track release was titled As Far as I'm Concerned and featured Guru (from Gang Starr) on "Do You Know" and Michelle Gayle on "In My Room" which interpolates the Beach Boys song of the same name. The latter was released as a single, along with "Game Plan" and "Old Fashioned".

Aside from his solo work, Martin has written with (or for) Jeff Beck, Maxi Priest, the Roots, Capleton, Lynden David Hall and the Sugababes.

In 2011, he signed a recording deal with Glasgow-based record label Innovation Music.

References 

1970 births
Living people
Black British male rappers
Welsh people of Jamaican descent
Welsh male rappers
Welsh male singers
Musicians from Cardiff
20th-century Black British male singers
21st-century Black British male singers